Charles Clyde Bowden (July 20, 1945 – August 30, 2014) was an American non-fiction author, journalist and essayist based in Las Cruces, New Mexico.

Background
He attended the University of Arizona and then the University of Wisconsin, where he obtained his master's degree in American intellectual history; while there he walked out as he was defending his dissertation for his doctorate, annoyed by the questions asked him by the review committee. He  was a writer for the Tucson Citizen and often wrote about the American Southwest. He was a contributing editor of GQ and Mother Jones magazine, and he wrote for other periodicals, including Harper's Magazine, The New York Times Book Review, Esquire, High Country News, and Aperture.

Bowden was the winner of the 1996 Lannan Literary Award for Nonfiction, the PEN Center USA’s First Amendment Award in 2011, and a 2010 award from United States Artists.  He grew up in Chicago but lived most of his life in Tucson, Arizona. He was known for his writings on the situation at the US–Mexico border and wrote often about the effects of the War on Drugs on the lives of the people in that region.

He died in Las Cruces, New Mexico, on August 30, 2014, after a brief illness. He was survived by his son and two siblings.  He left a number of manuscripts that are being published posthumously by The Bowden Publishing Project, which is also reissuing some of his earlier books.  His work and life were the subject of the Spring 2019 special issue of Journal of the Southwest, and a related book, America's Most Alarming Writer: Essays on the Life and Work of Charles Bowden.

Selected works
 The Impact of Energy Development on Water Resources in Arid Lands: Literature Review and Annotated Bibliography (Tucson: University of Arizona, Office of Arid Lands Studies, 1975)
 Killing the Hidden Waters (Austin: University of Texas Press, 1977)
 Street Signs Chicago: Neighborhood and Other Illusions of Big City Life / text by Charles Bowden and Lew Kreinberg; photographs by Richard Younker; foreword by William Appleman Williams (Chicago: Chicago Review Press, 1981)
 Blue Desert (Tucson: University of Arizona Press, 1986)
 Frog Mountain Blues / text by Charles Bowden; photographs by Jack W. Dykinga (Tucson: University of Arizona Press, 1987)
 Trust Me: Charles Keating and the Missing Billions / text by Charles Bowden and Michael Binstein (New York: Random House,1988)
 Mezcal (Tucson, Arizona: University of Arizona Press, 1988)
 Red Line (New York: Norton, 1989)
 Desierto: Memories of the Future (New York: Norton, 1991)
 The Sonoran Desert / photographs by Jack W. Dykinga; text by Charles Bowden (New York: H. N. Abrams, 1992)
 The Secret Forest / text by Charles Bowden; photographs by Jack W. Dykinga; introduction by Paul S. Martin (Albuquerque: University of New Mexico Press, 1993)
 Seasons of the Coyote: the Legend and Lore of an American Icon / essays by Charles Bowden, et al (San Francisco: HarperCollins West, 1994)
 Frog Mountain Blues ; photographs by Jack W. Dykinga; with a new afterword by the author (Tucson: University of Arizona Press, 1994)
 Blood Orchid: An Unnatural History of America (New York: Random House, 1995)
 Chihuahua: Pictures From the Edge / photographs by Virgil Hancock; essay by Charles Bowden (Albuquerque: University of New Mexico Press, 1996)
 Stone Canyons of the Colorado Plateau / photographs by Jack W. Dykinga; text by Charles Bowden (New York: Abrams, 1996)
 The Sierra Pinacate / Julian D. Hayden; photographs by Jack Dykinga; essays by Charles Bowden and Bernard L. Fontana (Tucson: University of Arizona Press, 1998)
 Juárez: The Laboratory of our Future / text by Charles Bowden; preface by Noam Chomsky; afterword by Eduardo Galeano (New York: Aperture, 1998)
 Torch Song (article – 1998)
 Paul Dickerson, 1961–1997 / essay by Charles Bowden (New York: American Fine Art Co., 2000)
 Eugene Richards (New York: Phaidon, 2001)
 Down by the River: Drugs, Money, Murder, and Family (New York: Simon & Schuster, Inc., 2002)
 Blues for Cannibals: The Notes from Underground (New York: North Point Press, 2002)
 Killing the Hidden Waters / with a new introduction by the author (Austin: University of Texas Press, 2003)
 A Shadow in the City : Confessions of an Undercover Drug Warrior (New York: Harcourt, 2005)
 Sometimes a Great Notion / text by Ken Kesey; introduction by Charles Bowden, pp. xiii–xix (Penguin Books, 2006)
 Kill the Messenger: How the CIA's Crack-Cocaine Controversy Destroyed Journalist Gary Webb / text by Nick Schou; preface by Charles Bowden (New York: Nation Books, 2006)
 Inferno / text by Charles Bowden; photographs by Michael P. Berman (Austin: University of Texas Press, 2006) Winner of the Border Regional Library Association's Southwest Book Award
 Exodus/Éxodo / text by Charles Bowden, photographs by Julián Cardona (Austin: University of Texas Press, 2008)
 Trinity (Austin: University of Texas Press, 2009; with photographs by Michael P. Berman)
 Some of the Dead are Still Breathing: Living in the Future (Boston: Houghton, Mifflin, Harcourt, 2009)
 The Charles Bowden Reader (Austin: University of Texas Press, 2010; edited by Erin Almeranti and Mary Martha Miles; foreword by Jim Harrison)
 Dreamland: The Way Out of Juárez / text by Charles Bowden; illustrations by Alice Leora Briggs (Austin: University of Texas Press, 2010)
 Murder City: Ciudad Juárez and the Global Economy's New Killing Fields / text by Charles Bowden; photographs by Julián Cardona (New York: Nation City, 2011)
 El Sicario: The Autobiography of a Mexican Assassin / co-editors Molly Molloy and Charles Bowden (North Sidney, NSW: Random House Australia, 2011)
 Dead When I Got Here: Asylum from the Madness (2014); Executive Producer of documentary in collaboration with Director/Producer Mark Aitken – deadwhenigothere.org
 Some of the Dead Are Still Breathing: Living in the Future (Austin: University of Texas Press, 2018)
 Dakotah: The Return of the Future (Austin: University of Texas Press, 2019; foreword by Terry Tempest Williams)
 Jericho  (Austin: University of Texas Press, 2020; foreword by Charles D'Ambrosio)
 The Red Caddy: Into the Unknown with Edward Abbey (Austin: University of Texas Press, September 2020; foreword by Luis Alberto Urrea)
 Sonata (Austin: University of Texas Press, October 2020; foreword by Alfredo Corchado)

References

Archival sources 
 The Charles Bowden Papers 1947–2007 (50 linear feet) are housed at the Wittliff Collections, Texas State University in San Marcos.

External links 
 
 A review of Blues for Cannibals – From The New York Times
 Entrance Wound – An excerpt from Blues for Cannibals
 An Interview with Charles Bowden
 Charles Bowden articles at Harper's Magazine
 Charles Bowden articles at Byliner
 An audio interview with Charles Bowden – From American Public Media's Marketplace
 
 Charles Bowden on "The War Next Door" – video by Democracy Now!
 Charles Bowden on “Murder City: Ciudad Juárez and the Global Economy’s New Killing Fields” – A live interview with Charles Bowden on Democracy Now! April 14, 2010
 NPR interview with Bowden about "Shadow in the City" on NPR's Day to Day July 5, 2005
 "Charles Bowden on The War Next Door", High Country News, March 1, 2010
 
 Obituary in The Guardian September 8, 2014

1945 births
2014 deaths
American non-fiction environmental writers
20th-century male writers
American political writers
American conservationists
Writers from Joliet, Illinois
People from Las Cruces, New Mexico
Writers from Tucson, Arizona
University of Wisconsin–Madison alumni
American male essayists
20th-century American essayists
21st-century American essayists
American investigative journalists
Writers from New Mexico
21st-century American male writers
American nature writers
American male non-fiction writers
20th-century American male writers